Ilya Tyunis (born 4 July 1994) is a Belarusian football midfielder who plays for Osipovichi.

Club career
Born in Minsk, Tyunis played with Smorgon, Gorodeya and Neman Stolbtsy in his home country between 2012 and 2016. In summer 2016, he joined Serbian side Dinamo Vranje. Tyunis made his Serbian First League debut for Dinamo Vranje in 4 fixture match of the 2016–17 season against OFK Odžaci, played on 4 September 2016. He left the club in 2017.

References

External links
 
 
 Ilya Tsiunis profile at meczyki.pl

1994 births
Living people
Footballers from Minsk
Association football midfielders
Belarusian footballers
Belarusian expatriate footballers
Expatriate footballers in Serbia
Expatriate footballers in Lithuania
Serbian First League players
FC Dinamo Minsk players
FC Smorgon players
FC Gorodeya players
FC Volna Pinsk players
FC Neman Stolbtsy players
FK Dinamo Vranje players
FC Pakruojis players
FC Oshmyany players
FC Orsha players
FC Viktoryja Marjina Horka players
FC Uzda players
FC Osipovichi players